Events from the year 1972 in Belgium.

Incumbents
Monarch: Baudouin
Prime Minister: Gaston Eyskens

Events
 8 May – Sabena Flight 571
 18 June – UEFA Euro 1972 final tournament at Heysel Stadium
 12 to 14 November – Cyclone Quimburga

Publications
 Biographie Nationale de Belgique, vol. 37 (supplement 9).
 OECD, Economic Surveys: Belgium–Luxembourg Economic Union
 David Owen Kieft, Belgium's Return to Neutrality: An Essay in the Frustration of Small Power Diplomacy (Oxford, Clarendon Press)
 Robert Senelle, La  révision  de  la Constitution, 1967-1971 (Brussels, Ministère  des  affaires étrangères)
 P. de Stexhe, La révision de la Constitution belge, 1968-1971 (Brussels and Namur, Larcier and Société d’études morales, sociales et juridiques)
 P. Wigny, La troisième révision de la Constitution (Brussels, Bruylant)

Births
 1 February – Johan Walem, footballer
 28 March – Anja Lenaers, cyclist
 29 March – Jef Desmedt, equestrian
 13 May – Stefaan Maene, swimmer 
 24 May – Mimount Bousakla, politician
 26 May – Jef Aerts, author
 23 September – Sam Bettens, musician
 15 October – Sandra Kim, singer
 27 October – Anke Van dermeersch, beauty queen
 6 December – Alex Callier, musician

Deaths
 5 January – Gérard Devos, footballer
 21 January – André Fierens, footballer
 17 February – François Devries, footballer
 30 March – Raymond Decorte, cyclist
 17 April – Jan Engels, cyclist
 5 June – Louis Mottiat, cyclist
 7 July – Camille Tihon, archivist 
 20 December – Karel Kaers, cyclist

References

 
1970s in Belgium
Years of the 20th century in Belgium